Vratićeš se Satane is the third album by the Serbian noise-rock band Klopka Za Pionira, released in 2005 (see 2005 in music) on the Ne-ton independent label. It consists of ten songs, cover versions of tracks by Satan Panonski, which is unusual for Klopka. It is also unusual for Mileta to sing lyrics that are not his own. The cover art was by Bouraiqc des Merdes.


Track listing
All lyrics by Ivica Čuljak and music by Klopka Za Pionira
"To sam ja" – 2:50
"Kamikaza" – 4:24
"Mario" – 4:42
"Oči u magli" – 2:50
"Pioniri maleni" – 3:25
"Advokat" – 5:23
"Euro" – 2:28
"Oči u magli" – 4:16
"Misli li istok..." – 3:32
"Vratićeš se Satane" – 6:17 (This song is listed on the back cover under letter A instead of number 10, probably indicating that it is a bonus track.)

Personnel
Mileta Mijatović - vocals
Damjan Brkić - guitar, drum machine
Vladimir Lenhart - bass guitar, tapes

References

External links 
 

Klopka Za Pionira albums
2005 albums